Shwe Einthi (also Shwe Einsi) was a princess of Pagan Dynasty of Burma (Myanmar). She was the only daughter of King Kyansittha (r. 1084–1113), and the mother of King Alaungsithu.

The princess is best remembered in Burmese history for her failed love affair with the prince of Pateikkaya, a kingdom, believed to be in East Bengal or in eastern Chin Hills. Soon after her father became king in 1084, she fell in love the prince who was visiting Pagan. But her father forbade her to marry a foreigner, and instead married her off to Prince Saw Yun, the son of the late King Saw Lu. The primate of Pagan Shin Arahan broke the news to the prince, who subsequently committed suicide.

The princess had two children with Saw Yun: Soe Saing, and Sithu, who succeeded Kyansittha.

Notes

References
 
 

Pagan dynasty
Burmese royalty
11th-century Burmese women